Robert James Perry is an American physicist.

Perry earned a degree in liberal arts at St. John's College, Annapolis, and pursued a doctorate in physics from the University of Maryland, College Park. He taught at Ohio State University and was granted emeritus status upon retirement. In 1998, Perry was elected a fellow of the American Physical Society, "[f]or the development of renormalization group coupling coherence and the identification of a simple confinement mechanism, which led to a constituent picture in light-front QCD." The American Association for the Advancement of Science granted Perry an equivalent honor in 2007.

References

Fellows of the American Association for the Advancement of Science
Fellows of the American Physical Society
University of Maryland, College Park alumni
Ohio State University faculty
Living people
Year of birth missing (living people)
20th-century American physicists
21st-century American physicists
St. John's College (Annapolis/Santa Fe) alumni